Antonietta Dell'Era (10 February 1860 Milan  22 June 1945 Berlin) was an Italian prima ballerina best known for originating the role of the Sugar Plum Fairy in Tchaikovsky's ballet, The Nutcracker (1892).

Dance career
1879 until 1909, Dell'Era had a successful career at the Berlin Opera, praised by many critics and writers including author and poet Theodor Fontane.

1886 and 1894, she danced in Russia, mainly in St. Petersberg, along with the "Italian Invasion" - an influx of talented Italian dancers to Russia that included Pierina Legnani, Enrico Cecchetti, and Virginia Zucchi.

Nutcracker 
The St. Petersberg premiere of the Nutcracker sold out.   Peter Tchaikovsky, the famous Russian composer, was commissioned by mastermind choreographer Marius Petipa to compose the ballet.  The Nutcracker Ballet was first presented at the Mariinsky Theatre in St. Petersburg, Russia, on December 17, 1892.  It was a double premiere together with Tchaikovsky's last opera, Iolanta,. Dell'Era received five curtain calls but the critical reception of the ballet was poor. Her critical reception for her role as Aurora in The Sleeping Beauty had been better.

Russian ballet dancer Nicolai Solyannikov thought that Dell'Era's dancing in Nutcracker was awful.  "this coarse, ungraceful dancer is much to the German taste".

Ballet reflects political and cultural changes, and dancers were influenced by rise of expressionism and opposition to the rigidity classic ballet during her era of dance.

Legacy
Before her death in 1945, Dell'Era had expressed a wish that her estate should help dancers in need. The Dell'Era-Gedächtnis-Stiftung foundation was established after her death to provide dancers and their families with financial assistance towards living costs and expenses, such as medical costs, training and retraining.

References

Further reading

1860 births
1945 deaths
19th-century Italian ballet dancers
Italian ballerinas
Italian expatriates in Russia
Dancers from Milan
Prima ballerinas
20th-century Italian ballet dancers